The Hokenson Fishing Dock is located on Sand Island of the Apostle Islands National Lakeshore.

History
The fishing dock was operated by brothers Leo, Roy and Eskel Hokenson. It was added to the National Register of Historic Places in 1976 and to the Wisconsin State Register of Historical Places in early 1989.

References

Agricultural buildings and structures on the National Register of Historic Places in Wisconsin
Industrial buildings and structures on the National Register of Historic Places in Wisconsin
Buildings and structures on the National Register of Historic Places in Wisconsin
National Register of Historic Places in Bayfield County, Wisconsin
National Register of Historic Places in Apostle Islands National Lakeshore
Docks (maritime)
Buildings and structures completed in 1931